Ships of the French Navy have borne the name Aigle ("eagle"), honouring the bird of prey as well as the symbol of the First French Empire

Ships named Aigle 
  (1692–1712), a 36-gun ship of the line
 Aigle (1704–1710), a fireship
  (1751–1765), a 50-gun ship of the line
  (1780-1782), a 16-gun brig, ex-British privateer brig Eagle captured March 1780 at Saint Eustache in the Antilles. Arrived at Lorient January 1782 and listed as a corvette. HMS Duc de Chartres captured Aigle on 9 August 1782 off the American coast.
  (1781–1784), a lugger
  (1782), a 40-gun frigate that the British captured in 1782
 Aigle (1783–1788), a barge
  (1800–1805), a 
 Aigle (1805–1814), a landing craft
  (1813–1814), a xebec
  (1858), an aviso
  (1858–1891), an imperial yacht
  (1916–1919), an auxiliary patrol vessel
  (1919–1925), a tugboat
  (1932–1942), a destroyer, lead ship of her class
  (1987–2016), a

See also 
 
 
 

French Navy ship names